Adrian Pearsall (born 1925, Trumansburg, New York) was an American architect and furniture designer.

Adrian Mount Pearsall was born in Trumansburg New York. As a young man he went to the University of Illinois and studied Architectural Engineering. He graduated in 1950.

Adrian Pearsall founded Craft Associates in Pennsylvania in 1952 to manufacture his own designs. By the late 1950s his designs incorporating walnut became hugely popular.

References 
 Adrian Pearsall Home Page. 2013. Adrian Pearsall Home Page. [ONLINE] Available at: http://adrianpearsall.com/. [Accessed 28 January 2013].
 Adrian Mount Pearsall. 2013. Adrian Mount Pearsall. [ONLINE] Available at: http://www.ny30.org/adrianmountpearsall.htm. [Accessed 28 January 2013].

External links
 Mid-Century Online - Magazine | Adrian Pearsall: Advancing the Atomic Age

20th-century American architects
American furniture designers
People from Trumansburg, New York
University of Illinois alumni
1925 births
2011 deaths